Chanda is a poetic meter in Sanskrit.

Chanda may also refer to:

People

Given name
 Chanda Bwalya, Zambian football player
 Chanda Dancy (born 1978), American musical artist
 Chanda Gunn (born 1980), American ice hockey player
 Chanda Jog (born 1954), Indian astrophysicist
 Chanda Kochhar (born 1961), Indian banking executive
 Chanda Prescod-Weinstein, American astrophysicist
 Chanda Romero (born 1954), Philippine actress
 Chanda Rubin (born 1976), American tennis player

Surname
 Arnab Chanda, English writer, producer, and actor
 Arun Kumar Chanda (1899–1947), Indian independence activist
 Barun Chanda, Indian actor and author
 Nayan Chanda (born 1946), Indian journalist
 Raja Chanda, Indian film director
 Ramaprasad Chanda (1873–1942), Indian historian and archaeologist
 Rishi Chanda, Indian music director, composer and singer
 Samir Chanda (1957–2011), Indian art director and production designer
 Sandipan Chanda (born 1983), Indian chess player

Other uses
 Chanda (album), a 1996 album by Zubeen Garg and Jonkie Borthakur
 Chanda (Buddhism), a type of desire that can be wholesome
 Chanda (2007 film), a Kannada film
 Chanda (1962 film), an Urdu film
 Chanda (fish), a fish genus
 Chanda (monster), a mythological demon in Hinduism
 Chanda, Raebareli, a village in Uttar Pradesh, India
 Chanda, now Chandrapur, a city in Maharashtra, India 
 Chanda district, now Chandrapur district, Maharashtra, India
 Chandra Nalaar, a fictional planeswalker in the trading card game Magic: The Gathering

See also
 Chandamama (disambiguation)
Zambian surnames
Bemba-language surnames
Indian surnames